The 1928 United States Senate election in Delaware took place on November 6, 1928. Incumbent Republican U.S. Senator Thomas F. Bayard Jr. ran for a third term in office, but was defeated by former Republican Governor John G. Townsend Jr. in a landslide.

General election

Candidates
Thomas F. Bayard Jr., incumbent Senator since 1922 (Democratic)
John G. Townsend Jr., former Governor of Delaware from 1917 to 1921 (Republican)

Results

See also 
 1928 United States Senate elections

References

Delaware
1928
1928 Delaware elections